Robert Davison may refer to:

Robert Davison (figure skater) (born 1978), Canadian figure skater
Rob Davison (born 1980), Canadian ice hockey player
Bobby Davison (born 1959), English footballer and coach

See also
Robert Davidson (disambiguation)